The women's heavyweight (70 kg/154 lbs) Low-Kick division at the W.A.K.O. European Championships 2004 in Budva was the heaviest of the female Low-Kick tournaments and involved just three fighters.  Each of the matches was three rounds of two minutes each and were fought under Low-Kick kickboxing rules.

As there were not enough contestants for a tournament fit for four, one of the women had a bye through to the final.  The tournament winner was Croatian Radic Nives who defeated Andreeva Svetlana from Russia by unanimous decision to claim gold.  Olivera Milanovic from Serbia and Montenegro claimed bronze.

Results

Key

See also
List of WAKO Amateur European Championships
List of WAKO Amateur World Championships
List of female kickboxers

References

External links
 WAKO World Association of Kickboxing Organizations Official Site

W.A.K.O. European Championships 2004 (Budva)